Parsar Protected Area is a protected area in Myanmar, covering .

References

External links

Protected areas of Myanmar
Daen Lao Range
Protected areas established in 1996